Billie Keith Hughes (April 4, 1948 – July 3, 1998) was an American recording artist, songwriter, musician, and record producer. He is best known for his successful artist career in Japan, lead vocalist of his band Lazarus and his collaboration with Roxanne Seeman writing songs for Philip Bailey, Phil Collins, Bette Midler, The Jacksons, The Sisters Of Mercy, Wink, and for his songs in film and television. He has two Emmy nominations.

Hughes song "Welcome To The Edge", with the Japanese title "Todokanu Omoi"とどかぬ想い (One-Sided Love)" was the theme of the Japanese television drama I'll Never Love Anyone Anymore (Mou Daremo Aisanai) (もう誰も愛さない). It became the top-selling international single in Japan in 1991 after selling over 500,000 copies. Hughes was awarded with the No. 1 International Single of the Year in 1992 at the NHK Grand Prix Japanese Gold Disk Awards.

I'll Never Love Anyone Anymore (Mou Daremo Aisanai) (もう誰も愛さない) featuring Billie Hughes "Welcome to the Edge" ("Todokanu Omoi") began rebroadcasting on TVK (Television Kanagawa) in the Greater Tokyo Area, on October 8, 2019.

Early life and education

Billie Keith Hughes was born on April 4, 1948 in Graham, Texas, the son of Betty (née Capps) and Billie Wayne Hughes (Aug. 5, 1924 - November 14, 2011), a travelling minister of the Church of Christ, math teacher, and general contractor. He had an older brother named Jim, (April 10, 1945 - May 3, 2019). Billie Keith was raised in a religious family moving from city to city. His father, Billie Wayne, was a minister, elder and education director of the Church of Christ in Sioux Falls, South Dakota, Denver, Colorado, and Marble Falls, Texas. Billie Wayne Hughes wrote "Studying Angels" and taught three classes on angels at the Abilene Christian University.

Hughes attended Abilene Christian College in Abilene, Texas. Hughes was offered a scholarship to Boston University as a violinist, but turned it down. He was the first chair violinist in the Abilene Christian College Orchestra and a member of the Abilene Christian College Acapella Choir. In September 1967, he became a member of the ACCents, an on-campus group that was formed two years earlier. All four singers in the new lineup played instruments. The ACCents performed for civic clubs, events including the Purple and White alumni parties over the state, the ACC chapel, and toured youth fellowships sponsored by Churches of Christ in Dallas, Jackson, Mississippi; Macon, Georgia; and Jacksonville, Gainesville, Tampa and Hialeah, Florida. Hughes was quoted as saying "A lot of our job is recruiting." In contemporizing their repertoire, he remarked "It's music that belongs to the set of today instead of the set of 10 to 20 years ago"

He played violin in the ACC Orchestra tour of Oklahoma, Kansas, and Texas, December 8–14, 1968 and in the Abilene Philharmonic Orchestra accompaniment for the homecoming musical "Oklahoma!".

Hughes co-founded another popular campus singing group called the Blue Sky Investment. The group consisted of Hughes, arranger, tenor vocalist and classical guitarist, Mike Haynes and Kay Ross on vocals, Carl Keesee on bass, and Marshal Locke on drums. The Blue Sky Investment held performances at Abilene Christian College, the University of Oklahoma, and for private engagements. Hughes composed original arrangements of songs from the Beatles repertoire for Blue Sky Investment performances opening a series of shows by ACC talent on April 4, 1968.

While at ACC, Hughes formed his own band, Shiloh, with Carl Keesee and Gary Dye. They met Peter Yarrow after a Peter, Paul & Mary concert at a local venue, and played their tape for him. They were signed by Yarrow and Phil Ramone to Bearsville Records, after which he dropped out of college and moved into Peter Yarrow's cabin in Woodstock to pursue his career with his band, renamed Lazarus.

Career

Lazarus
Hughes began his recording career as leader of the group Lazarus. In association with Peter Yarrow of Peter, Paul & Mary, Lazarus moved to Woodstock, New York, signing with the newly formed Bearsville Records label, under the direction of Albert Grossman.

Two Lazarus albums produced by Yarrow and Phil Ramone were recorded and released on Bearsville. In the next four years, Lazarus performed extensively throughout the United States and Canada. They opened for Todd Rundgren in Vermillion, South Dakota at his USD concert, a city known in pop culture as the Vermillion Rundgren name-drops on his Back to the Bars live album.

Lazarus released two albums, the first eponymous Lazarus in 1971, and the second, A Fool's Paradise in 1973.

In 1974, The Lettermen covered the Hughes song "Eastward", from the first Lazarus album. It was released as a single, reaching No. 16 on the Billboard US Adult Contemporary chart, and included on The Lettermen's Now And Forever album.

In 1976 Lazarus won the Clio Award for "Life Savers" Best Commercial of the Year which ran nine years nationwide.

Solo career
In the mid '80s Hughes lived in London, Ontario Canada where he regularly performed at Smale's Pace, a well-known coffeehouse on the Canadian folk circuit, at Groaning Board, and at folk festivals across Canada. During the Canadian years he was sometimes accompanied by David Bradstreet and Lazarus bassist Carl Keesee, and occasionally Lazarus performed as a full band including Randy Kumano, Allan Soberman and Wayne Smith.

John Capek, the first independent producer to produce a broadcast recording for the CBC, produced Bill Hughes at the CBC studios.

In January 1978, CBS Records Canada announced the signing of Bill Hughes, former member of the band Lazarus, to a long-term recording contract. Hughes was the first recording artist signed by the Canadian affiliate of CBS to receive a guaranteed American release and full tour support. A reception for the signing of Hughes was held at the Prince Hotel in Toronto. Hughes shared his intention of setting up his residence in Canada and applying for Canadian citizenship and spoke of his plans to record in Los Angeles in the following months.

In 1982, Hughes released an album entitled "Last Catch" credited to "Horton, Bates & Best", a solo album by Bill Hughes that was re-released digitally in 2006 with the title "A Tribute to Canadian Songwriter by Billie Hughes". The album comprised nine cover versions of songs by Canadian songwriters including: Bruce Cockburn, David Wiffen, Brent Titcomb, David Bradstreet, Colleen Peterson and David Essig and was well received by the Canadian press.

Work with Anne Murray 
In Toronto, Hughes met and recorded background vocals for Anne Murray on the title track of her "Let's Keep It That Way" album in 1978. In the mid-1980s, he toured with Murray singing the duet part of "Nobody Loves Me Like You Do" and "Now And Forever".

Dream Master 
Hughes' Dream Master album was produced by Henry Lewy and recorded at A&M Recording Studios in Los Angeles. Jose Feliciano appears on the track "Only Your Heart Can Say" as a guest artist on guitar and background vocals.

Working with Roxanne Seeman
In 1983 Hughes formed a partnership with Roxanne Seeman recordingwhich set in motion a career of recording, producing, and writing songs for film, television, and records including songs produced by Phil Collins, Arif Mardin, Michael Omartian, George Duke and Reggie Lucas and included such artists as Philip Bailey, The Jacksons, Bette Midler, The Sisters Of Mercy, Randy Crawford, Al Jarreau, Melissa Manchester, and the No. 1 charting Japanese duo Wink, among others.

In 1990, Hughes wrote "Welcome to the Edge" with Roxanne Seeman and Dominic Messinger, for the daytime TV drama Santa Barbara.  It appeared for the first time in January 1991 performed by Billie Hughes and continued as a recurring love theme for a love triangle over the next two years. A female vocal version also appeared in the show. "Welcome to the Edge" was recorded in Japanese by the female J-pop duo Wink (ウィンク, Uinku).

In 1991, a new arrangement of Hughes' "Welcome to the Edge", produced with Roxanne Seeman, appeared as a theme song in the hit Japanese TV drama I'll Never Love Anyone Anymore (Mou Daremo Aisanai) (もう誰も愛さない) "Welcome To The Edge" (with the Japanese title "Todokanu Omoi"とどかぬ想い (One-Sided Love)) was the single and title track from the album released by Pony Canyon Japan. "Welcome to the Edge" remained in the Top 10 of the Billboard Japan chart for four months, selling 520,000 singles.  The album sold 120,000 copies.

In March 1992, Hughes performed "Welcome to the Edge" (with the Japanese title "Todokanu Omoi"とどかぬ想い (One-Sided Love)) at the NHK nationally televised Japanese Grand Prix Awards and received the award for "#1 International Single of the Year". MC Hammer performed "U Can't Touch This" at this show.

"Welcome to the Edge" received an Emmy nomination for Best Original Song in the television show Santa Barbara.

Hughes and Seeman wrote "Dreamlove" (Dream Love), a love theme appearing in the daytime television show Another World, for which they received a second Emmy nomination for Best Original Song.

In September 2004, the first pop concert in history was staged on the Great Wall of China outside of Beijing with Alicia Keys headlining. Hughes and Seeman's song "Walking on the Chinese Wall" by Philip Bailey produced by Phil Collins was the finale of the event.

Film soundtracks

Martin Eden
During the next four years, Hughes toured the United States, Canada and Japan performing as an artist and travelled to Japan, Canada and Italy to record and produce various projects including his own hit single "Martin Eden" (CBS motion picture theme song) which charted top 5 all over Europe.

Hughes wrote the song "Martin Eden" with Italian composers Ruggero Cini and Dario Farina. It was written from the composer's theme from the Martin Eden 1979 TV mini-series based on the Jack London novel, directed by Giacomo Battiato.

Hughes recorded his vocals for "Martin Eden" in Rome. It was released as a single in Europe where it topped the Billboard charts in several territories, such as Sweden where it reached No. 2.

The Outsiders 
Hughes performed the songs "Stay Gold" written by Stevie Wonder with Carmine Coppola and "The Outside In" written by Carmine Coppola, Italia Pennino and Roxanne Seeman on The Outsiders (Original Motion Picture Soundtrack).

Little Monsters 
Hughes performed the song "I Wanna Yell" written and produced by Hughes and Seeman for the montage scene of Little Monsters. The song played as Maurice, (Howie Mandel), and Brian Stevenson, (Fred Savage), played pranks.

He also performed the song "Magic Of The Night", written and produced by Mike Piccarillo, for the movie.

Television performances 
American Music Awards with Anne Murray, "Now And Forever", 1986
NHK Grand Prix Gold Disk Awards, Japan

Death 
Hughes died on July 3, 1998, of a heart attack in Los Angeles.  He was survived by his parents and two daughters.

Discography

Albums

With Lazarus
1971: Lazarus 
1973: A Fool's Paradise

Solo
1976: Street Life
1979: Dream Master 
1981: Horton, Bates & Best: The Last Catch 
1991:Welcome to the Edge 
2006: A Tribute to Canadian Songwriters (re-issue)

Singles
1972: "Warmth Of Your Eyes", Lazarus
1973: "Ladyfriends I (Sing a Song to Your Lady)," Lazarus 
1979: "Martin Eden", theme from Martin Eden (miniseries) 
1979: "Stealin' My Heart Away" (7", Promo) 
1991: "Welcome to the Edge" (CD, Mini, Single)

Notable album appearances 

 1972: Peter - Peter Yarrow; on "River of Jordan", "Take off Your Mask" (background vocals)
1976: Street Life, CBC Radio Canada Broadcast Recording series, songs: "Quiet Moment", "Gypsy Lady", and "Dreams Come True"
 1978: Let's Keep it That Way - Anne Murray; on "Let's Keep it That Way" (background vocals)

Selected songwriting credits 
1971: "Blessed" by Lazarus on Lazarus
1971: "Meanings Will Change" by Paul Stookey on Paul and
1972: "Warmth of Your Eyes" by Lazarus on Lazarus
1973: "Ladyfriends I (Sing a Song to Your Lady)" by Lazarus on A Fool's Paradise
1973: "Blessed" by Noel Paul Stookey on One Night Stand
1974: "Eastward" by The Lettermen on Now And Forever
1974: "Blessed" by Gene Cotton on In the Gray of the Morning
1976: "Quiet Moment" by Bill Hughes on Street Life CBC series
1979: "Martin Eden" theme from Martin Eden (miniseries) by Bill Hughes
1979: "Stealin' My Heart Away" by Bill Hughes on Dream Master
1979: "Only Your Heart Can Say" by Bill Hughes on Dream Master
1984: "Walking on the Chinese Wall" by Philip Bailey on Chinese Wall
1985: "Heart of Love" from The Heavenly Kid by Jamie Bond
1987: "Love Is An Art" by Pernilla Wahlgren on Pure Dynamite
1988: "One Way" by Al Jarreau on Heart's Horizon
1989: "The Blue Line" by Yoshimi Iwasaki on Tsuki-yo ni Good Luck
1989: "I Wanna Yell" from Little Monsters by Billie Hughes
1989: "If You'd Only Believe" by The Jacksons on 2300 Jackson Street
1991: "Welcome To The Edge" love theme from Santa Barbara by Billie Hughes 
1991: "Todokanu Omoi"とどかぬ想い (One-Sided Love) by Billie Hughes
1991: "Welcome To The Edge" by Bon Chic
1991: "Night and Day" by Bette Midler on Some People's Lives
1991: "Welcome To The Edge" by Billie Hughes on Welcome To The Edge
1991: "Yoru no Tsuki, Hiru no Tsuki" (夜の月、昼の月, "Night Moon, Day Moon") by Wink on Queen of Love1991: "Jūnigatsu no Orihime" (12月の織姫, "Orihime in December") by Wink on Back to Front
1991: "Omoide made Soba ni Ite (Welcome to the Edge) [Album Version]" ((想い出までそばにいて (Welcome To The Edge), "I'll Stay by Your Side Until You Remember (Welcome to the Edge)" by Wink on Back to Front
1991: "Like a Bird" by Wink on Each Side of Screen
1992: "If You'd Only Believe" by Randy Crawford on Through the Eyes of Love
1993: "Under The Gun" by The Sisters of Mercy on A Slight Case of Overbombing

References

External links 
 
 The 6th Japan Gold Disc Awards, 1992 http://www.golddisc.jp/award/06/index.html

1998 deaths
American rock musicians
1948 births
20th-century American musicians
Epic Records artists
American rock singers
Singer-songwriters from Texas
20th-century American singers
20th-century American writers
American folk musicians
American soft rock musicians
Performers of Christian rock music
Guitarists from Texas
20th-century guitarists
Pony Canyon artists
Bearsville Records artists
American rock guitarists
American multi-instrumentalists
American soul singers
American pop rock singers
Christian music songwriters
Warner Records artists
American male singer-songwriters
American acoustic guitarists
American performers of Christian music